"Moon" (stylized in all caps) is a song by South Korean girl group (G)I-dle from their fourth Korean-language extended play, I Burn (2021). The song was written by Soyeon, and its producers Minnie, FCM Houdini and FCM 667. The song was released on January 11, 2021, as the third track on the album.

Background
In an interview with Hypebae, (G)I-dle explained "Moon" touches on the desire to hide one's feelings. Minnie, who is in charge of composing "Moon" described that the song contains honest feelings that cannot be shown to others. "I personally cherish it so much." The song was composed by Minnie with the thought of the Moon, as she described "so bright that I can see my reflection, and hide my feelings and fears because I was so sad." When she was asked if it was difficult to write lyrics, Minnie responded, "With "Moon", Because it's Soyeon who you can trust when it comes to songs, I entrusted the lyrics to her. It was really good, I really liked it. I thought about the moon when I wrote this song, and I told Soyeon that. I'm really thankful that she wrote the lyrics beautifully."

Music and lyrics
"Moon" has been described as a pop genre song that builds up a dancerable disco rhythm, bass, and synthesizer with an addictive hook melody. It is a song that depicts a situation in which the darkness was taken away from the night when the moon was bright, and it tells that there is an honest feeling that cannot be shown to others. In terms of musical notation, the song is composed in the key of A minor, with a tempo of 96 beats per minute, and runs for three minutes and 20 seconds.

Critical reception
Upon release, Verónica A. Bastardo of The Quietus wrote, "It is easy to get lost between the many K-pop girl groups that go with the classic hip-hop/pop/EDM/I’m-a-badass-and-I’ll-show-you sound and the bubblegum-pop/dancehall/high-pitched-voices-from-the-girl-next-door one. So it’s refreshing to hear a tracklist that is musically daring, by experimenting with genre mixes and exploring universal emotions through vulnerability and figurative narratives." and further added, "Like 'Moon', that combines the characteristic East Asian instrumentation and electro-rock to beg the nocturnal satellite to pleeeaase stop shining so I can hide my sadness in the dark." Melon Magazine called the song "unique dreaminess". Beats Per Minute'''s JT Early stated the song is the "highlight on the album" as it "details the importance of processing, emphasising that once the anger has been drained away, you are left to deal with the raw emotional aftermath." The author described "Moon" as a "beautiful, dynamic song about wanting to stay concealed in the darkness to process the wounds that have been inflicted" with "bewitching production consisting of plucked strings, guitars, organs and synths which culminates in a mystical feel." Also praised that the group can be "lyrically honest about the post-breakup agoraphobia – the need to stay in your own space to heal after your heart is shattered." Writer Skye Sutton of The Kraze'' agreed that this song has Minnie's "signature sound" as her songs "always have a certain flair [...] that’s very refreshing in an industry". She also called the song "a great track that gives you a rather neutral feeling, like you’re in the middle stages of realization, denial, and recovery."

Track listing
Download and streaming
 "Moon" – 3:20

Credits and personnel
Credits are adapted from Cube Entertainment, and NetEase Music.

 (G)I-dle – Vocals
 Minnie – Producer, audio engineer, background vocal
 Soyeon – Songwriter
 FCM Houdini – Producer, audio engineer, guitar, synthesizer 
 FCM 667 – Producer, bass
 Jeon Jae-hee – Background vocal
 Kim Dong-min – Guitar
 Hanseul – Keyboard
 Shin Jae-bin  – Record engineering, audio mixing
 Choi Ye-ji  – Record engineering
 Kwon Nam-woo  – Audio mastering
 Jang Seung-ho  – Assistant audio mastering

Charts

References

External links
 

(G)I-dle songs
2021 songs
Korean-language songs
Songs written by Jeon So-yeon
Songs written by Minnie (singer)